Giacomo "Jack" Bonaventura ((born 22 August 1989) is an Italian professional footballer who plays as a midfielder for Serie A club Fiorentina and the Italy national football team.

Bonaventura started his senior career at Atalanta in the Serie A in 2007, his impressive performances earning him a  €7 million transfer to AC Milan in 2014, spending six seasons at the club, before leaving in 2020.

Bonaventura has been a youth national team member since 2008. He made his senior international debut on 31 May 2013, in a friendly match against San Marino.

Club career

Atalanta
After playing for San Francesco 93' youth team, he was transferred to Tolentino, where he was noticed by one of Atalanta's scouts, Antonio Bongiorni. Bonaventura made his debut with Atalanta on 4 May 2008, in a match against Livorno. He only played this match in the whole 2007–08 season. He appeared again on 9 November, against Fiorentina.

On 13 January 2009, Atalanta announced he had joined Pergocrema on loan for the remainder of the 2008–09 season. Five days later, he made his debut for Pergocrema, getting on the scoresheet in a match against Sambenedettese. He made three more appearances before returning to Atalanta.

He returned to La Dea, but had to wait until January 2010 to appear again, this time against Palermo. On 1 February, he joined Serie B club Padova on loan until the end of the season. He made his debut for the club on the 20th, against Triestina.

In June 2010, Padova decided not to buy him outright, and Bonaventura returned to Atalanta, signing a contract extension until 2015.

On 9 November, he scored his first Atalanta goal, against Modena. He played a key part for La Dea during the 2010–11 season, scoring nine times, with his club being crowned Serie B champions, thus earning promotion to Serie A. On 11 April 2012, he scored his first Serie A goal, against Napoli, before scoring again in a 2–0 victory against Fiorentina on 29 April. He scored his first brace on 3 March 2013, in a 2–0 victory against Siena.

AC Milan

2014–15 season
In late August, Atalanta and Hellas Verona had agreed for the signature of Bonaventura and Verona's ex sporting director, Sogliano, had talked to Giacomo but on 1 September 2014, in the last hours of the Italian transfer window, AC Milan announced the signature of Bonaventura from Atalanta for a fee reported to be around €7 million after they failed to sign Jonathan Biabiany. His agent later revealed that Bonaventura cried after signing for Milan as his dream became true. He was given the number 28, which was previously worn by Urby Emanuelson. On 14 September, Bonaventura scored a goal on his debut as Milan beat Parma 5–4.
Bonaventura scored his second goal for Milan on 29 October against Cagliari and was voted man of the match. On 12 December, Bonaventura scored a powerful header and assisted Jérémy Ménez's goal as Milan defeated Napoli 2–0; Bonaventura was also voted man of the match against Napoli and again in the next week against Roma. The following match against Sassuolo, he scored a goal and later in the match he received a second yellow card and was sent off. It was the first time in his career that he was sent off. On 30 May, he scored twice against his former team Atalanta in a 3–1 victory. Bonaventura finished his first season at Milan with 7 goals and 4 assists in all competitions.

2015–16 season
On 23 August 2015, Bonaventura made his season debut as Milan lost 2–0 to Fiorentina. The following match against Empoli, Bonaventura came on the pitch as the substitute for Suso in the 55th minute and managed to assist Luiz Adriano's winning goal from a corner kick 15 minutes later. On 19 September, Bonaventura assisted Carlos Bacca's first goal and scored directly from a free-kick in a 3–2 win over Palermo. He also gained another assist and goal in Milan's next game, the 2–3 win over Udinese. Once again, he assisted both Carlos Bacca's and Philippe Mexès' goals against Lazio in the 3–1 away win on 1 November. He continued to perform well under the team's coach Siniša Mihajlović and became a fundamental player for his team throughout the season. After missing a 0–0 draw against his former team Atalanta through suspension, he scored the opener in a 4–1 defeat of Sampdoria on 28 November. He scored again in his next game on 1 December, a 3–1 Coppa Italia defeat of Crotone, via a brilliant 20-yard free kick. On 20 December he assisted Carlos Bacca's goal and scored a late goal as Milan beat Frosinone 4–2. On 17 January 2016, he provided another assist for Carlos Bacca as the Rossoneri beat Fiorentina 2–0. He ended the season with 7 goals and 8 assists in all competitions as Milan finished 7th in Serie A, and lost out in the Coppa Italia final against Juventus, following a 1–0 defeat in extra time.

2016–17 season

At the beginning of the season, Bonaventura switched his number from 28 to 5. He started Milan's opening match of the Serie A season against Torino. In the second half of the match, he was fouled inside the six-yard box by Joel Obi and Milan was given a penalty which was converted by Carlos Bacca to complete his hat-trick in Milan's 3–2 win. He scored his first goal of the season on 2 October in Milan's memorable comeback against Sassuolo as the game finished 4–3. The following week he assisted M'Baye Niang's goal against ChievoVerona in a 3–1 win. He also assisted Suso's first goal in the 2–2 draw against city rivals, Inter. On 23 December 2016, Bonaventura scored the equalising goal in the Supercoppa Italiana against Juventus; he later netted his penalty in the resulting shoot-out, helping Milan to a 4–3 victory. He signed a contract extension through 2020 with Milan on 18 January 2017. On 29 January, Bonaventura suffered an injury in a match against Udinese which ruled him out for the rest of the season following surgery on a thigh injury; earlier in that match, he scored Milan's goal in the 2–1 loss. He returned to the squad for the last game of the season against Cagliari on 28 May, but couldn't make an appearance during the match as Milan lost 2–1. He ended the season with 5 goals and 4 assists in 22 appearances in all competition as Milan finished 6th in Serie A, was knocked out of Coppa Italia in quarter-finals by eventual champions Juventus, and also won the Supercoppa Italiana.

2017–18 season
Bonaventura played his first game in Europe in a 1–0 win against CS U Craiova in the first leg of Milan's Europa League qualification match on 27 July 2017. He also featured in the second leg the following week, in which he scored the first goal in their 2–0 win. It was his first goal in a European competition and he was voted Man of the Match thereafter for his performance. On 17 August, he got a late injury in Milan's Europa league playoff match against Shkëndija. On 14 September 2017, Bonaventura made his 100th Milan appearance, in a 5–1 away win against FK Austria Wien. His first goal of the season in Serie A against Benevento on 3 December. The following week he scored a brace in a 2–1 win against Bologna. On 6 January 2018, he made his 100th appearance in Serie A for Milan in a 1–0 win against Crotone. He played his 200th match in Serie A on in the 2–1 victory over Cagliari on 21 January 2018.

2018–19 season
Bonaventura scored on Milan's opening fixture of the season against Napoli on 25 August. In October 2018, he suffered a knee injury that was expected to keep him out of play for nine months. Bonaventura did not return to training with the first team for the rest of the season.

2019–20 season
Bonaventura made his first appearance for the season in Round 5 of the 2019–20 Serie A season on 26 September 2019, 11 months after his last appearance for the club. On 23 November 2019, he scored his first goal since 7 October 2018 in a 1–1 draw against Napoli. He scored the winner against Bologna in a 3–2 win two weeks later. He was released by Milan at the end of the season, following the expiration of his contract. His last appearance for the club was as a substitute in a 3–0 win against Cagliari at the final day of the season, coming on for Rafael Leão at the 38th minute.

Fiorentina 
In September 2020, Bonaventura signed for Fiorentina on a two-year contract.

International career
After featuring with under-19, under-20 levels, Bonaventura made his debut with the senior squad on 31 May 2013, in a 4–0 friendly victory against San Marino in Bologna, under Cesare Prandelli. His second appearance for Italy came 16 months later, in a friendly against Albania, during which he managed to assist Stefano Okaka's match–winning goal in a 1–0 victory in Genoa. In May 2016, he was named to Antonio Conte's preliminary 30-man Italy squad for UEFA Euro 2016. However he was later left out of the final 23-man squad for the tournament.

Style of play
A quick, hard-working, and creative offensive midfielder, with great vision, passing, and technique, Bonaventura is a mobile and versatile player who is capable of playing in several midfield positions; in addition to his favoured central position as a trequartista behind the strikers, he has also often been deployed as a central midfielder, in the mezzala role, or as a left winger, or even on the left in an attacking trident. He has also been deployed in a box-to-box role on occasion, a position in which he was described as a tuttocampista, in the Italian media, namely a player who covers the entire pitch. He is talented in keeping possession effectively, due to his ball skills and dribbling ability, and also excels at creating space or chances for teammates through his movement and awareness. In addition to his ability to assist goals, he is also a capable goalscorer, courtesy of his powerful shot from distance with either foot, despite being naturally right-footed, as well as his attacking positioning, heading, and eye for goal; he is also an accurate free kick taker. In addition to his playing ability, Bonaventura has also stood out for his leadership qualities, character, and maturity as a footballer, as well as his work-rate off the ball and his ability to track back and perform defensive duties for his team, which enables him to cover for his teammates and protect the defensive line. Due to his effectiveness in the game, he has earned the nickname "Jack" (from the poker card, which is also an Anglicised abbreviation of his name) in the media; this is because, as the card falls on the field, like Bonaventura, its presence never goes unnoticed.

Career statistics

Club

International

Honours 
Atalanta
Serie B: 2010–11

AC Milan
Supercoppa Italiana: 2016

Italy U20
Mediterranean Games runner-up: 2009

Individual
Premio Gentleman: 2016

References

External links

Profile at the ACF Fiorentina website 
 
 Giacomo Bonaventura National Team Stats at FIGC.it 

1989 births
Living people
Italian footballers
Atalanta B.C. players
U.S. Pergolettese 1932 players
Calcio Padova players
A.C. Milan players
ACF Fiorentina players
Serie A players
Serie B players
Serie C players
Association football midfielders
Sportspeople from the Province of Macerata
Italy youth international footballers
Italy under-21 international footballers
Italy international footballers
Mediterranean Games silver medalists for Italy
Mediterranean Games medalists in football
Competitors at the 2009 Mediterranean Games
Footballers from Marche